The Fast Library for Number Theory (FLINT) is a C library for number theory applications. The two major areas of functionality currently implemented in FLINT are polynomial arithmetic over the integers and a quadratic sieve. The library is designed to be compiled with the GNU Multi-Precision Library (GMP) and is released under the GNU General Public License. It is developed by William Hart of the University of Kaiserslautern (formerly University of Warwick) and David Harvey of University of New South Wales (formerly Harvard University) to address the speed limitations of the PARI and NTL libraries.

Design Philosophy 
 Asymptotically Fast Algorithms
 Implementations Fast as or Faster than Alternatives
 Written in Pure C
 Reliance on GMP
 Extensively Tested
 Extensively Profiled
 Support for Parallel Computation

Functionality 
 Polynomial Arithmetic over the Integers
 Quadratic Sieve

References 

Notes

 FLINT 1.0.9: Fast Library for Number Theory by William Hart and David Harvey
 Video of the talk Parallel Computation in Number Theory (30 January 2007) by William Hart
 Video of the talk FLINT and Fast Polynomial Arithmetic (13 June 2007) By David Harvey
 Video of the talk A short talk on short division (1 October 2007) by William Hart
 Video of the talk Algebraic Number Theory with FLINT (11 November 2007) by William Hart

Computational number theory
Free software programmed in C
Integer factorization algorithms
Numerical software